Tabanan is one of the regencies (kabupaten) in Bali, Indonesia. Relatively underdeveloped (compared with Badung and Denpasar to the east), Tabanan Regency has an area of 1,013.88 km2 and had a population of 386,850 in 2000, rising to 420,913 in 2010, then 461,630 at the 2020 census. Its regency seat is the town of Tabanan. One of the popular tourism attractions located in Tabanan is Tanah Lot.

Administrative districts
The regency is divided into ten districts (kecamatan), tabulated below with their areas and population totals at the 2010 census and the 2020 census. The table also includes the number of administrative villages (rural desa and urban kelurahan) in each district and its postal codes.

The administrative centre of Selemadeg District is at Bajera, that of Selemadeg Timur is at Megati, and that of Selemadeg Barat is at Antosari; the other districts share the same name as their administrative centre.

Jatiluwih

Jatiluwih village in Penebel District, north of Tabanan, has paddy fields following the contours of terraced land against the background of spellbinding Mount Batukaru and Mount Agung use traditional Balinese irrigation known as subak, Bali's community-based water control management system. Lies at an altitude of 700 meters, the cool atmosphere of more original beautiful Jatiluwih is better than the most well-known Tegallalang which has plenty of cafes and souvenir shops. Two routes to Jatiluwih are Denpasar>Kediri>Tabanan>Penebel>Jatiluwih or Denpasar>Mengwi>Baturiti>Jatiluwih.
Jatiluwih is one of the five rice terraces that describe the "Subak" water management system which has gain acknowledgment from UNESCO as part of the world's cultural heritage.

Tourism development control
To preserve the largest area of 53,000 hectares of agriculture fields on the island, Tabanan Regency Administration would not allow the development of star-rated and city hotels anymore, unless tourism facilities with a commitment to environmental conservation would be allowed with 30 percent of buildings and 70 percent had to be left naturally as paddy field or plantation. The administration has also decided 300-hectare protected paddy field zone with a 100-hectare housing zone lies outside the protected zone.
For visitors, it is possible to visit the 300-hectare on foot (about 3 hrs trekking) or alternatively with an e-bike tour that the local villagers organize since 2017 (about 1 h).

Climate
Tabanan has a tropical rainforest climate (Af) with moderate rainfall from April to September and heavy rainfall from October to March.

References

External links